Helis (also Romanized as Helīs; also known as Helīs Maḩalleh and Helīs Maḩalleh-ye Shīrābād) is a village in Haviq Rural District, Haviq District, Talesh County, Gilan Province, Iran. At the 2006 census, its population was 308, in 78 families.

References 

Populated places in Talesh County